Mal'ak (also spelled Malak, Melek) may refer to: 

 Malak Hifni Nasif (1886-1918), Egyptian feminist and poet
 Malak Karsh (1915–2001), Canadian photographer
 Malak, Northern Territory a suburb in the City of Darwin, Australia
 Mal'ak Elohim or angel of the Lord
 Darth Malak, a character from the fictional Star Wars universe

See also
 Angels in Judaism
 Angels in Islam
 Malach (disambiguation)
 Malik (disambiguation)
 Malakh, a Somali title meaning war leader
 Melek (disambiguation)

Arabic unisex given names